Messias Baptista may refer to:
 Messias José Baptista, Brazilian athlete
 Messias Baptista (canoeist), Portuguese sprint canoeist